Old River  may refer to:
 Old River (Belize)
 Old River (Tasmania), Australia
 The Old River, in the Australian state of Victoria

In the United States:
 Old River (Clay County, Arkansas) a lake in Clay County, Arkansas
 Old River (Cross County, Arkansas) a lake in Cross County, Arkansas
 Old River (California)
 Old River (Florida)
 Old River (New Hampshire)

 Places
 Old River, California
 Old River-Winfree in Chambers and Liberty Counties, Texas

 Other
 Old River Control Structure, connecting the Red River to the Atchafalaya and Mississippi Rivers